Phi Sigma Beta may refer to:

 Phi sigma beta, a former "zone" or country district of US chapters of Phi Sigma Alpha, a Puerto Rican-based fraternity 
 Phi Sigma Gamma, a professional fraternity for osteopathic medicine formed prior to 1915, which merged with Phi Omega Gamma to form Phi Sigma Gamma by 1916.
 Phi Sigma Beta, a dormant general women's sorority formed at Pace University in 1951, which in the 1990s had created three additional chapters. Some of its chapters survived into the 2000s.